The following is a list of 'notable deaths in October 2004

Entries for each day are listed alphabetically by surname. A typical entry lists information in the following sequence:
 Name, age, country of citizenship at birth, subsequent country of citizenship (if applicable), reason for notability, cause of death (if known), and reference.

October 2004

1
Richard Avedon, 81, American fashion and portrait photographer.
Jimmy Campbell, 82–83, Scottish football player and manager (Clyde, national team).
Joyce Jillson, 58, American astrologer, newspaper columnist, author and actress, kidney failure.
Bruce Palmer, 58, Canadian bassist (Buffalo Springfield), heart attack.
Aleksandr Rogov, 48, Soviet Olympic canoer (gold medal winner in men's C-1 500 metres individual canoeing at the 1976 Summer Olympics).

2
Ralph Citro, 78, American boxing historian, archivist and cutman, member of the International Boxing Hall of Fame.
Max Geldray, 88, Dutch jazz harmonica player often credited as the world's first, and Goon Show performer.
Fialho Gouveia, 69, Portuguese radio and TV presenter, respiratory failure.
Nick Skorich, 83, American NFL offensive lineman and coach (Philadelphia Eagles), after heart valve surgery.

3
Ken Brondell, 82, American baseball player (New York Giants).
John Cerutti, 44, American Major League Baseball baseball player, announcer for the Toronto Blue Jays, natural causes.
Janet Leigh, 77, American actress (Psycho, The Manchurian Candidate, Touch of Evil), vasculitis.
Marvin Travis Runyon, 80, American business executive and civil servant.
Frits van Turenhout, 91, Dutch sports journalist.

4
Helmut Bantz, 83, German gymnast and Olympian (gold medal in pommel horse gymnastics, 1956), after long illness.
Syd Bycroft, 92, English footballer player.
Gordon Cooper, 77, American NASA astronaut and aeronautical engineer, one of the original Mercury Seven astronauts, heart failure.
Michael Grant, 89, British ancient historian.
Emīlija Gudriniece, 84, Soviet/Latvian chemist.

5
Rodney Dangerfield, 82, American comedian and actor (Easy Money, Caddyshack, Back to School), Grammy winner (1981), complications from heart surgery.
William H. Dobelle, 62, American biomedical researcher, eye doctor and inventor (artificial vision research), complications of diabetes.
Sir John Richards, 77, British Royal Marines general.
Wayne Rutledge, 62, Canadian professional ice hockey player (Los Angeles Kings, Houston Aeros).
Maurice Wilkins, 87, New Zealand-born British physicist and molecular biologist, Nobel laureate (Physiology or Medicine, 1962) for work on DNA.

6
William Clark, Baron Clark of Kempston, 86, British politician and peer.
Frederica de Laguna, 98, American anthropologist and archaeologist, studied Alaskan native cultures.
Johnny Kelley, 97, American long-distance runner and Olympian (1936, 1948).
Pete McCarthy, 51, British travel writer and broadcaster, cancer.
Marvin Santiago, 56, Puerto Rican salsa singer, complications of diabetes.
Norm Schlueter, 88, American baseball player (Chicago White Sox, Cleveland Indians).
Veríssimo Correia Seabra, 57, Bissau-Guinean military commander, beaten to death in mutiny.
Harbhajan Singh Yogi, 75, Indian spiritual leader and head of the Sikh Dharma in the western hemisphere, heart failure.
Clem Tholet, 56, Rhodesian singer and songwriter

7
Kenneth Bigley, 62, British civil engineer taken hostage in Iraq, beheaded by hostage takers.
T. J. Binyon, 68, British author, Oxford professor, Pushkin scholar and crime novelist.
Tony Lanfranchi, 69, British racing driver, cancer.
Miki Matsubara, 44, Japanese singer, cervical cancer.
Dame Rosemary Murray, 91, British chemist, Vice-Chancellor of the University of Cambridge (1975–1977).
Hildy Parks, 78, American actress, writer and TV producer, complications of stroke.

8
James Chace, 72, American historian.
Tony Giuliani, 91, American baseball player (St. Louis Browns, Washington Senators, Brooklyn Dodgers).
Kenneth G. Mills, 81, Canadian philosopher and musician.
Johnny Sturm, 88, American baseball player (New York Yankees) and minor league manager, congestive heart failure.
Mei Zhi, 90, Chinese children's author and essayist.

9
Jacques Derrida, 74, French philosopher (deconstruction), pancreatic cancer.
Maxime Faget, 83, American aerospace engineer (NASA, Space Shuttle program), designer of the Mercury space capsule, bladder cancer.
Herschel Grossman, 65, American economist.
Richard K. Sorenson, 80, United States Marine and recipient of the Medal of Honor.
Bryan R. Wilson, 78, British author of religious books.

10
Ken Caminiti, 41, American baseball player, drug overdose.
Christopher Reeve, 52, American actor (Superman, The Remains of the Day, Deathtrap) and stem cell research activist, heart failure.
Arthur H. Robinson, 89, American cartographer and geographer, after short illness.
Maurice Shadbolt, 72, New Zealand novelist, playwright and journalist, Alzheimer's disease.
Denis Wakeling, 85, British Anglican prelate, Bishop of Southwell (1970–1985).

11
Sir Paul Bryan, 91, British politician.
Lord Nicholas Gordon Lennox, 73, British diplomat, Ambassador to Spain (1984–1989). 
Peter Kerr, 12th Marquess of Lothian, 82, British peer, politician and landowner.
Elisabeth Klein, 93, Hungarian-Danish pianist.
Ben Komproe, 62, Netherlands Antilles politician, Prime Minister (2003) and Minister of Justice (2003–2004), kidney failure and complications from gastric surgery.
Mary Loos, 94, American actress, screenwriter, and novelist, complications from stroke.
Keith Miller, 84, Australian Test cricketer, Australian rules footballer, fighter pilot and journalist.
Csaba Pálinkás, 45, Hungarian Olympic cyclist.
Gulshan Rai, 80, Indian film producer and distributor, after long illness.
Lillian Zuckerman, 88, American character actress.

12
Tommy Kalmanir, 78, American football player.
Kim King, 59, American businessman, leukemia.
Samson Kutsuwada, 57, Japanese wrestler.
Lawrence E. Roberts, 81, colonel in the US Air Force, heart attack.

13
Mohammad Va'ez Abaee-Khorasani, 64, Iranian cleric and reformist politician, physical illness.
Mike Blyzka, 75, American baseball player (St. Louis Browns/Baltimore Orioles).
Erik Bye, 78, Norwegian journalist (AP, BBC, NRK), radio/TV host, actor, singer/songwriter, cancer.
Adremy Dennis, 28, American convicted murderer, executed by lethal injection.
David Grose, 59, American archaeologist and classicist.
Archie McIndewar, 83, Scottish footballer.
Nirupa Roy, 73, Indian film actress, heart attack.
Bernice Rubens, 76, British Booker Prize-winning novelist (The Elected Member), complications from stroke.
Tetsu Yano, 80, Japanese science fiction writer and translator, founder of the Science Fiction Writers of Japan.
Ivor Wood, 72, British animator (Paddington Bear, The Wombles Postman Pat), cancer.

14
Peter Adelaar, 57, Dutch judoka.
Vlassis Bonatsos, 54, Greek entertainer.
Willie Browne, 68, Irish soccer player.
Juan Francisco Fresno, 90, Chilean Roman Catholic prelate, Archbishop of Santiago de Chile (1983-1990).
Cordell Jackson, 81, American rockabilly musician.
Sheila Keith, 84, British actress.
Conrad Russell, 5th Earl Russell, 67, British peer, historian and member of the House of Lords, complications of emphysema.
Ivan Shamiakin, 83, Soviet Belarusian writer.

15
Bill Eyden, 74, British jazz drummer.
Dave Godin, 68, British soul music promoter and journalist, coined the term "northern soul".
Irv Novick, 88, American comic book artist (Batman, The Flash, Superman).
Tex Ritter, 80, American professional basketball player (Eastern Kentucky, New York Knicks).

16
Doug Bennett, 52, Canadian rock singer (Doug and the Slugs), after long illness.
Vincent Brome, 94, British biographer and novelist.
Harold Perkin, 77, English social historian, helped to establish social history as a major area of study.
Pierre Salinger, 79, American journalist, Senator (California, 1964) and Press Secretary to John Fitzgerald Kennedy and Lyndon B. Johnson, heart failure.
Bassam Zuamut, 53, Israeli actor and screenwriter, kidney disease.

17
Ray Boone, 81, American Major League Baseball player, patriarch of first third-generation MLB family, after long illness.
Julius Harris, 81, American actor (Live and Let Die, Super Fly, The Taking of Pelham One Two Three), heart failure.
Betty Hill, 85, American alien abduction claimant, lung cancer.
Uzi Hitman, 52, Israeli singer, songwriter and composer, heart attack.
Bas Pease, 81, British physicist.
Wu Faxian, 89, Chinese revolutionary and military officer, commander of the People's Liberation Army Air Force/

18
Nancy Carline, 94, British artist.
Richie Lemos, 84, Mexican-American boxer.
Maurice Stewart, 75, Irish Anglican priest, Dean of St. Patrick's Cathedral, Dublin (1991–1999).
Koose Muniswamy Veerappan, 52, Indian bandit known as "Jungle Cat", shot by Special Task Force.

19
Antoine Abel, 69, Seychellois writer.
Anita Bitri, 36, Albanian pop singer, carbon monoxide poisoning.
Frank Chapple, Baron Chapple of Hoxton, 83, British trade unionist (General Secretary of EETPU, 1966–1984).
George Daneel, 100, South African rugby player.
Kenneth E. Iverson, 84, Canadian computer scientist, inventor of the APL programming language, stroke.
Paul Nitze, 97, American diplomat and Cold War arms negotiator.
Kingsley Rasanayagam, 63, Sri Lankan politician.
Calvin Ruck, 79, Canadian member of Parliament (Senate of Canada representing Nova Scotia).
Sang Lee, 51, Korean-American three-cushion billiard player, stomach cancer.
Greg Shaw, 55, American rock-music journalist and record label executive, known as a major force in the spread of underground music and fanzine publishing.
Liviu Vasilică, 54, Romanian folk singer, cirrhosis.
Lewis Urry, 77, Canadian chemical engineer and inventor (alkaline battery, lithium battery).

20
William Brown, 66, American operatic tenor.
Veronika Cherkasova, 45, Belarusian journalist, stabbed.
Anthony Hecht, 81, American poet, lymphoma.
Chuck Hiller, 70, American Major League Baseball baseball player and coach, first National League player to hit a World Series grand slam, leukemia.
Tevfik Gelenbe, 73, Turkish actor and comedian, complications of cancer.
Lynda Lee-Potter, 69, British newspaper columnist (Daily Mail), brain tumour.
C. P. Spencer, 66, American singer and songwriter, and member of the Motown quartet The Originals ("Baby, I'm For Real", "The Bells").

21
Imad Abbas, Palestinian Hamas militant and assistant to Adnan al-Ghoul, targeted killing by the IDF.
Adnan al-Ghoul, Palestinian Hamas chief explosives expert, alleged "father" of the Qassam rocket, targeted killing by the IDF.
Sharifa Alkhateeb, 58, American teacher and writer.
Jim Bucher, 93, American baseball player (Brooklyn Dodgers, St. Louis Cardinals, Boston Red Sox).
Everett Rogers, 73, American communication scholar and sociologist, founder of diffusion of innovations theory.
Victoria Snelgrove, 21, American college junior, shot with pepper spray projectile by Boston Police.

22
Bertie Brownlow, 84, Australian cricketer.
Samuel L. Gravely, Jr., 82, American naval pioneer (first African American fleet commander and admiral), complications from stroke.
Lawrence Stark, 78, American neurologist and a pioneer in the use of engineering analysis to characterize neurological systems.
Katherine Victor, 81, American cult film actress.

23
Edward T. Cone, 87, American composer, music theorist, pianist, and philanthropist.
Jim McDonald, 77, American baseball player.
Robert Merrill, 87, American operatic baritone, natural causes.
Bill Nicholson, 85, British football manager (Tottenham Hotspur, 1958–1974), player, coach, and scout.
Dorothy Comstock Riley, 79, American judge, Chief Justice of the Michigan Supreme Court (1987–1991).
George Silk, 87, New Zealand WWII photojournalist (Life), congestive heart failure.

24
Randy Dorton, 50, American engine builder (Hendrick Motorsports), victim of the 2004 Martinsville plane crash.
Bethany Goldsmith, 77, American baseball player.
Ricky Hendrick, 24, American NASCAR stock car driver and partial team owner (Hendrick Motorsports), plane crash.
James Aloysius Hickey, 84, American Roman Catholic Cardinal, Archbishop of Washington, D.C. (1980–2000), Bishop of Cleveland, Ohio (1974–1980).
Maaja Ranniku, 63, Soviet (Estonian) chess International Master, women's Soviet chess champion, ten-time Estonian women's chess champion.
Herbert Schilling, 74, German Olympic boxer (light welterweight boxing at the 1952 Summer Olympics).

25
Thomas Kanza, 71, Congolese diplomat and ambassador, heart attack.
A. David Mazzone, 76, American judge (United States district judge of the United States District Court for the District of Massachusetts).
Shyam Nandan Prasad Mishra, 84, Indian politician (foreign minister, 1979–1980), cardiac arrest.
John Peel, 65, British BBC disc jockey and guru of the British independent music scene, heart attack.

26
Bobby Ávila, 79, Mexican MLB All-Star and American League batting champion (1954), complications of diabetes.
Russ Derry, 88, American baseball player (New York Yankees, Philadelphia Athletics, St. Louis Cardinals).
Paul F. Iams, 89, American businessman, founder of the Iams pet food company, complications from broken hip.
Robin Kenyatta, 62, American jazz alto saxophonist.
Ricardo Odnoposoff, 90, Austrian violinist.
Fred Paine, 78, American professional basketball player (Providence Steamrollers).

27
Al Clouston, 94, Canadian storyteller and humourist.
Hermione Cobbold, Baroness Cobbold, 99, British aristocrat.
Olavi Laaksonen, 83, Finnish Olympic football player.
Lester Lanin, 97, American jazz big band leader.
Lars Nordwall, 76, Swedish Olympic cyclist (men's individual and team cycling road races at the 1952 and 1956 Summer Olympics).
Marwell Periotti, 65, Argentine Olympic footballer (men's football at the 1960 Summer Olympics).
Paulo Sérgio Oliveira da Silva ("Serginho"), 30, Brazilian footballer (São Caetano), heart attack during match.

28
Rosalind Hicks, 85, British literary guardian and the only child of Agatha Christie.
Jimmy McLarnin, 96, British boxer, two-time welterweight world champion (1933, 1934).
Gil Mellé, 72, American artist, jazz saxophonist and film and television composer, heart attack.
Graham Roberts, 75, British actor (The Archers, Z-Cars).
George S. Schairer, 91, American aerodynamics expert at Boeing (B-47 Stratojet, B-52 Stratofortress, Boeing 707, Boeing 727, Boeing 737, Boeing 747).
Ted Taylor, 79, Mexican-born American theoretical physicist, nuclear weapon designer and eventual nuclear disarmament advocate, coronary artery disease.
William E. Wallace, 87, American chemist, complications from Parkinson's disease.
Charles F. Wheeler, 88, American cinematographer (Tora! Tora! Tora!).

29
HRH Princess Alice, Duchess of Gloucester, 102, British royal, aunt of Queen Elizabeth II.
Jacinto João, 60, Portuguese footballer, heart attack.
Shosei Koda, 24, Japanese backpacker, beheaded by kidnappers in Iraq.
Edward Oliver LeBlanc, 81, Dominican political leader, chief minister (1961–1967) and premier (1967–1974).
Vaughn Meader, 68, American Grammy-winning comedian and JFK impersonator, emphysema.
Gerard Ross Norton, 89, South African soldier and Victoria Cross recipient (1944),
Peter Twinn, 88, British mathematician, World War II codebreaker, and entomologist.

30
Dame Phyllis Frost, 87, Australian welfare worker and philanthropist.
Rein Otsason, 73, Estonian economist and banker, heart failure.
Peggy Ryan, 80, American actress (All Ashore, Hawaii Five-O), singer and dancer (partnered with Donald O'Connor).
David Shulman, 91, American lexicographer and cryptographer, known for his frequent contributions to the Oxford English Dictionary.
Eddie Straiton, 87, British veterinarian.

31
Don Briscoe, 64, American stage and television actor (Dark Shadows''), heart disease.
Sir Roland Gibbs, 83, British Field Marshal.
Sir David Gore-Booth, 61, British diplomat.
Valentin Nikolayev, 80, Soviet Olympic wrestler (gold medal winner in men's light heavyweight wrestling at the 1956 Summer Olympics).
Helen Z. Papanikolas, 87, Greek-American historian, educator and author, known for documenting the immigrant experience in the American West.
Russell Reinke, 82, Canadian member of Parliament (House of Commons representing Hamilton South, Ontario).
Marie Tehan, 64, Australian Liberal politician (Victorian Parliament, 1987–1999), Creutzfeldt–Jakob disease.

References

2004-10
 10